Gosnell may refer to:

People 
 Bert Gosnell (1880–1972), English international footballer
 Harold Foote Gosnell (1896–1997), American political scientist and author
 James Frederick Gosnell, mayor of London, Ontario, Canada
 Jim Gosnell (1899–1969), Australian rules footballer
 Joseph Gosnell (1936–2020), distinguished leader of the Nisga'a people of northern British Columbia, Canada
 Kermit Gosnell (born 1941), American doctor, abortion provider, and convicted murderer in Philadelphia
 Raja Gosnell (born 1958), American film director and editor
 Tom Gosnell (1951–2014), mayor of London, Ontario, Canada

Other uses 
 Gosnell, Arkansas - a city in Mississippi County, Arkansas, United States
 Gosnell: The Trial of America's Biggest Serial Killer, a movie about Kermit Gosnell
 Gosnell School District

See also 
 Gosnells (disambiguation)